NGC 1128 is a dumbbell galaxy in the Abell 400 galaxy cluster. At the center of the galaxy is 3C 75, a radio source, and contains two orbiting supermassive black holes that may be merging. Computer simulations indicate that these two black holes will gradually spiral in toward each other until they merge. Lewis Swift is credited with the discovery of NGC 1128 in 1886.

References

External links
 
 Black Holes Dance With Incredible Violence (SpaceDaily) 12 April 2006
 3C 75 in Abell 400: Black Holes Determined to be Bound (Chandra AXAF)
  More Images of 3C 75 in Abell 400 (Chandra AXAF)
 NGC 1128 (jpeg, Chandra AXAF)
 

Interacting galaxies
Radio galaxies
Elliptical galaxies
Abell 400
1128
11188
Cetus (constellation)